Conus plinthis is a species of sea snail, a marine gastropod mollusk in the family Conidae, the cone snails and their allies.

Like all species within the genus Conus, these snails are predatory and venomous. They are capable of "stinging" humans, therefore live ones should be handled carefully or not at all.

Description
The size of the shell varies between 16 mm and 61 mm.

Distribution
This marine species occurs off New Caledonia and the Kermadec Islands.

References

 Richard, G. & Moolenbeek, R., 1988. Two New Conus Species from Deep Waters of New Caledonia. Venus 47(4): 233–239
 Tucker J.K. & Tenorio M.J. (2009) Systematic classification of Recent and fossil conoidean gastropods. Hackenheim: Conchbooks. 296 pp. 
 Puillandre N., Duda T.F., Meyer C., Olivera B.M. & Bouchet P. (2015). One, four or 100 genera? A new classification of the cone snails. Journal of Molluscan Studies. 81: 1–23

External links
 The Conus Biodiversity website
 Cone Shells - Knights of the Sea
 
 Holotype in MNHN, Paris

plinthis
Gastropods described in 1988